Ryan Dale Stevenson (born January 21, 1979) is an American Christian musician and guitarist, who primarily plays a contemporary Christian music and worship style of music. His record label is Gotee Records, co-owned by Christian music artist TobyMac. He released three extended plays, Yesterday, Today, Forever, with BEC Recordings, Champion of the World, independently, and Hold Nothing Back, with Gotee Records. His first studio album, Fresh Start, was released on September 18, 2015, with Gotee Records. He's had five songs chart on the Billboard charts, "Holding Nothing Back", "The Human Side", "Not Forgotten", "All Yours" and "Eye of the Storm".

Early life
Ryan Dale Stevenson was born on January 21, 1979 in Bonanza, Oregon to James and Phyllis; he has an older sister, Janay. They raised him in the church, exposing him to hymns at an early age. He was given his first instrument, a guitar, at 18 years old. Stevenson credits his mother as the one who fostered his musical skills while growing up, through her prayers and support for his chosen profession. His mother died of bone cancer on October 3, 2009, at 58 years old. He attended Northwest Christian College, where he honed his musical talent with his roommate, Paul Wright. They formed a small band, primarily focusing on acoustic music and performing at local restaurants in and around Eugene, Oregon.

Music career
His music career commenced in 2003. However, his first release, an independently made album, Running to You, was not released, until June 12, 2007, by Off the Vine Music. He released, The Undiscovered, independently in 2010. The first extended play, Yesterday, Today, Forever, was released on February 15, 2011, with BEC Recordings. He released, a second extended play, Champion of the World, independently, on July 1, 2012. His third extended play, Holding Nothing Back, was released on September 10, 2013, from Gotee Records. Stevenson's songs have appeared on the Billboard magazine charts six-times, with two placing on two charts the Christian Songs and Christian Airplay, and those songs are "Holding Nothing Back", "The Human Side", "Not Forgotten", and "All Yours". The first studio album, Fresh Start, was released on September 18, 2015, by Gotee Records and featured the 15-week No. 1 single "Eye of the Storm". In 2018, he also released No Matter What.

Personal life
He is married to Kim. Stevenson was the worship minister at Vertical Church. Before his music career began, Stevenson had been a paramedic for seven years.

Discography

Independent albums

 Running to You (June 12, 2007, Off the Vine)
 The Undiscovered (2010)

Studio albums

Extended plays
 Yesterday, Today, Forever (February 15, 2011, BEC)
 Champion of the World (July 1, 2012, independent)
 Holding Nothing Back (September 10, 2013, Gotee)

Singles

Awards and nominations

GMA Dove Awards

 * Was a joint win alongside Zach Williams' 'Chain Breaker'.

Notes

References

External links
 

1979 births
Living people
American performers of Christian music
Musicians from Oregon
Musicians from Boise, Idaho
Songwriters from Oregon
Songwriters from Idaho
Bushnell University alumni
People from Klamath County, Oregon